Brachysola is a genus of plants in the family Lamiaceae, first described in 2000. It contains two known species, both endemic to the State of Western Australia.

 Brachysola coerulea (F.Muell. & Tate) Rye  (syn Chloanthes coerulea F.Muell. & Tate, Pityrodia coerulea (F.Muell. & Tate) Ewart & Jean White)
 Brachysola halganiacea (F.Muell.) Rye (syn Chloanthes halganiacea F.Muell., Pityrodia halganiacea (F.Muell.) E.Pritz.)

References

Lamiaceae
Lamiaceae genera
Endemic flora of Australia
Taxa named by Barbara Lynette Rye